Lorena Sevilla Mesina (born April 16, 1991) is a Mexican, actress, model and beauty pageant titleholder who won the title Nuestra Belleza Interncional México 2015 and represented Mexico at the Miss International 2015 pageant.

Pageantry

Colima 2014
Lorena won the title of Nuestra Belleza Colima 2014 and represented her state at the Nuestra Belleza Mexico 2014.

Nuestra Belleza México 2014
Sevilla won the title of third runner-up and was designated as Nuestra Belleza Internacional México 2015. She will now represent Mexico at Miss International 2015.

Miss International 2015
Lorena Sevilla represented Mexico at Miss International 2015 and placed Top 10.

References

External links
Official Nuestra Belleza Mexico Website

Living people
Miss International 2015 delegates
Nuestra Belleza México winners
People from Colima City
1991 births